Byron Smith (born March 31, 1981) is an American professional golfer who currently plays on the PGA Tour.

Smith was born in Palm Springs, California and attended Pepperdine University. He did not play golf during his last two years at Pepperdine but he turned professional in 2001.

Smith first played on the Canadian Tour in 2005 but did not break through until 2007. In his 2007 Canadian Tour season, he won twice, recorded five top-10 finishes, earned over $89,000 in earnings and won the Order of Merit title. The Order of Merit title win gave Smith a five-year exemption on the Canadian Tour. After a winless 2008 season, Smith won his 3rd Canadian Tour event at the Times Colonist Open in 2009. He has also played on the Hooters Tour where he finished in the top-10 of the money list in 2004. He lost in a playoff of a Spanos Tour event in 2005.

Smith played on the Web.com Tour in 2014 and earned his first Tour win at the Rex Hospital Open. He finished 42nd in the Web.com Tour Finals to earn his PGA Tour card for the 2014–15 season.

Professional wins (5)

Web.com Tour wins (1)

Canadian Tour wins (4)

See also
2014 Web.com Tour Finals graduates

External links

American male golfers
Pepperdine Waves men's golfers
PGA Tour golfers
Korn Ferry Tour graduates
Golfers from California
Sportspeople from Palm Springs, California
People from Palm Desert, California
1981 births
Living people